Cooking on the Wild Side is a cooking show hosted by Phyllis Speer and John Philpot on the Arkansas Educational Television Network (AETN) and produced by the Arkansas Game and Fish Commission. The show was originally part of Arkansas Outdoors, and featured many cooking segments from that series alongside new content.

Phyllis Speer and John Philpot have co-hosted together for over 18 years, first on Arkansas Outdoors and then on Cooking on the Wild Side. Speer is known for her work in education, and a member of the Arkansas Game and Fish Commission's Hall of Fame. John Philpot is a "longtime regular on Arkansas radio and television programs," known for his work in education and agriculture. He is also a member of the Arkansas Agriculture Hall of Fame.

There was a reunion episode of its hosts (with all new content) in 2013.

Series evolution

Arkansas Outdoors
Cooking on the Wild Side was originally part of Arkansas Outdoors, in which hosts Phyllis Speer and John Philpot played similar roles. Arkansas Outdoors began in 1991, and gained national exposure beyond AETN to include Versus Cable Television (previously known as Outdoor Life Network). Arkansas Outdoors was "produced by the Arkansas Game and Fish Commission with the intention of showcasing the natural beauty of Arkansas and the many sporting and nature activities available in the wild, each segment concludes with Speer sharing a recipe or two, using her castiron cookery."

Arkansas Outdoors production stopped in early 2011, although Cooking on the Wild Side continued.

Series breakoff
Cooking on the Wild Side became its own series in 2006 as Cooking on the Wildside: A Farmer's Market Tour with Phyllis in part "as an answer to the requests the station received for Phyllis Speer's recipes," according to AETN.

It evolved into its modern format in 2012 and was distributed nationally in 2014.

Episodes
Episodes showcase Arkansas wild game, how to use a Dutch oven, and the interplay between the two hosts. According to Speer, the Dutch oven is underused because:

Previous recipes have included 

 Squirrel Tamales 
 Curried Goose
 Venison Jerky
 Dutch Oven Enchiladas
 Venison Smoked Sausage
 Venison Grillades and Grits
 Squirrel and Dumplings
 Dove Stroganoff

2013 reunion
Phyllis Speer and John Philpot reunited in 2013 for a two-part special titled "Cooking on the Wild Side: A Phyllis & John Reunion." The special first aired 9 a.m. Saturday, Dec. 7, 2013 on AETN, then repeated 4 p.m. Saturday, Dec. 14, and 1:30 p.m. Sunday, Dec. 15.

The reunion special was dedicated to the memory of Arkansas Outdoors producer, Jim Holmes.

Recipes
Both episodes and recipes may be found on AETN's website.

Recipes by episode

Cookbooks and DVDs
To celebrate the reunion of its hosts during the 2013 special Cooking on the Wild Side: A Phyllis & John Reunion, AETN published both a companion cookbook and DVDs of the reunion.

The cookbook was also titled Cooking on the Wild Side: A Phyllis & John Reunion and contained "more than 50 viewer-submitted recipes." Recipes in the cookbook included:

 Arkansas Wild Cakes, Remoulade Sauce
 Succotash Salad
 Apple Pizza
 Butternut Guacamole
 Dutch Oven Spicy Chicken Casserole
 Dutch Oven Pear Custard Pie
 Bar-B-Que Potatoes
 Pitchfork Fondue With Dipping Sauces
 Fried Biscuits

References

American educational television series
PBS original programming
1990s American cooking television series
2000s American cooking television series
2010s American cooking television series